WQXC-FM (100.9 FM, "Cool 101") is a radio station broadcasting an oldies format. Licensed to Allegan, Michigan, it first began broadcasting in 1981 under the WAOP call sign.

WQXC-FM was licensed to Otsego, Michigan from its sign-on until the city of license changed to Allegan in November 2006. Prior to adopting the current Oldies format aimed at the Kalamazoo market, the station had programmed Adult Contemporary music focused toward the Otsego/Allegan area. The station was also formerly known by the name "Quixie 101" (with "Quixie" being a sounding-out of the station's calls) prior to changing to "Cool 101."

Bronco Radio Network
For three seasons starting in the fall of 2007, WQXC was the flagship station of the Western Michigan University "Broncos Radio Network" for hockey and women's basketball.

See also
 WAKV 980 AM, WQXC's former sister station

Sources 
Michiguide.com - WQXC-FM History

External links

QXC-FM
Oldies radio stations in the United States
Radio stations established in 1981